The Gaylads are a Jamaican vocal group. They were one of the top rocksteady vocal groups active in Jamaica between 1963 and 1973.

History
The group, formed in Kingston, originally consisted of singers Harris "B.B." Seaton, Winston Delano Stewart and Maurice Roberts; Seaton and Stewart had previously been successful as the duo Winston & Bibby. There would be several line-up changes throughout The Gaylads' ten-year history, with Maurice Roberts remaining the only constant member. 

The Gaylads went on hiatus in 1964, with Seaton performing solo on the cabaret circuit, but they reformed in 1966.
The group's early successes were with producer Clement "Coxsone" Dodd at Studio One, and included "Lady in the Red Dress", "Stop Making Love", "You Should Never Do That", and "Don't Say No". Besides recording several hit records, The Gaylads also backed many influential musicians (including Ken Parker, Ken Boothe, and Delroy Wilson) on recordings. In 1968 they moved on to record for Sonia Pottinger and enjoyed further hit singles. They recorded for Leslie Kong in 1969, including the hit single "There's a Fire". Stewart left the group when he emigrated, and Kong's death dealt them a further blow, but they had further success recording for Rupie Edwards in the early 1970s. Seaton also emigrated, leaving Roberts as the only original member.

Roberts, the lone remaining original member, selected brothers Randell and Hopeton Thaxter to carry on the Gaylads name; the new lineup never matched the success of its predecessor, however, and after releasing the album, Love and Understanding, as the Gayladds, Roberts dropped any reference to the moniker and rechristened the trio the Psalms, landing as backing vocalists for Bunny Wailer. The founding duo of Seaton and Stewart reformed for the first time in over two decades for an appearance at the 1991 Studio One concert, and two years later Roberts joined them for a performance at the Rocksteady Reunion in Kingston. Seaton, who began his solo career in 1973 with the album Thin Line Between Love and Hate and enjoyed success throughout the years to follow—subsequently relocated to London to helm his revived Soul Beat imprint.

Some of their hits included one of the first singles encouraging repatriation - "Africa (We Want To Go)," "Joy In The Morning"; "Red Rose," (for Coxsone Dodd at Studio One), "It's Hard To Confess," "Over the Rainbow's End" (for Sonia Pottinger) and "My Jamaican Girl" (for Leslie Kong / Beverley's).

In 2012, the line-up of the Gaylads comprised Seaton and Randall Thaxter. By 2016 the group comprised Seaton, Harold Davis, and Dennis Spencer.

Maurice Roberts died on 14 August 2015 at the age of 70.

Albums
Soul Beat (1967), Studio One
Fire & Rain (1970), Beverley's
Understanding (1979), United Artists/Ballistic
Cornell Campbell Meets The Gaylads (with Sly and Robbie) (1984), Culture Press - split with Cornell Campbell
As the Psalms 
Up Front (1992), Solomonic

Compilations
Seal of Approval, Soul Beat - B.B. Seaton and the Gaylads
After Studio One (1997), Metro
Over the Rainbow's End (Best of The Gaylads) 1968-1971 (1995), Trojan
Ska Days, Studio One

References

Jamaican reggae musical groups
Trojan Records artists